The Ulster is a Victorian working daytime overcoat, with a cape and sleeves.

The Ulster is distinguished from the Inverness coat by the length of the cape. In the Ulster, the cape only reaches just past the elbows, allowing free movement of the forearms. In the Inverness coat, the cape is as long as the sleeves, and eventually replaced the sleeves in the Inverness cape. It was commonly worn by coachmen who would be seated outdoors in bad weather for long periods, but needed to use their arms to hold reins.

Often made of hard-wearing fabrics, such as herringbone tweed, it was not a formal coat at the time, though in the 20th century a cape would be seen as such. It began to lose its cape in the 1890s, and now rarely has a cape, but continued to be used as a heavy-duty overcoat, often in a double-breasted style.

A lightweight version of this coat is called an ulsterette.

Origins
 
Prior to the inception of the Ulster coat in the first half of the nineteenth century, the greatcoat or surtout was the main component of a gentleman's wardrobe. Whilst fashionable at the time, these garments proved to be very cumbersome for travel due to the heavy lengths of overlapping cloth involved in creating the silhouette. By the mid-1800s, these coats were replaced by lighter variations such as the Chesterfield Overcoat and the Albert. These coats were designed primarily for show, so did not amount to the same level of weather protection. John McGee of McGee & Co set about creating a coat that would fulfil this purpose.

By 1866, McGee had conceptualised the coat known as the ‘Ulster.’ The design was met with much attention upon its introduction and brought acclaim to the Irish designer. Due to the increased sales from the popular coat, the company invested in a second location in Belfast, known simply as the ‘Ulster Coat Warehouse.’ 
The success of the male coat eventually led to a public clamouring for the female version. And so in the early 1870s, an ulster coat for women was introduced to the market.

In fiction

It is often seen in period productions of Victorian novels, such as those of Charles Dickens and Sir Arthur Conan Doyle. The Ulster coat was referred to in Doyle's Sherlock Holmes novels and short stories: A Study in Scarlet, The Sign of the Four, A Scandal in Bohemia, The Adventure of the Blue Carbuncle and The Adventure of the Noble Bachelor (in which it is worn by a noblewoman). It has been used in a great many late-Victorian costume dramas since.

In the Sherlock Holmes short story Blue Carbuncle for example, Watson recounts that:
“It was a bitter night, so we drew on our ulsters and wrapped cravats about our throats.”

The novel, The Lodger, by Marie Belloc-Lowndes features the infamous Victorian criminal Jack the Ripper stalking the streets of Whitechapel wearing an ulster coat.
This was later replicated in the film adaption of the book by 20th Century Fox, where the villain played by Laird Cregar is seen burning an ulster coat in the fire after committing a murderous crime.

The coat also features briefly in James Joyce’s Dubliners collection of short stories. In the story ‘Grace,’ the character of Mr. Power is wearing an ulster coat when he approaches the drunk Mr. Kernan:
“a tall agile gentleman of fair complexion, wearing a long yellow ulster, (coming) from the far end of the bar…” 

In L.M. Montgomery's Anne of Green Gables, Diana is mentioned to wear a "blood-red ulster" at Christmas.

Marlow, the narrator in Joseph Conrad’s Heart of Darkness, observes: "There was an agent buttoned up inside an ulster and sleeping on a chair on a deck within three feet of me."

The title character of Madeline wore an ulster coat as a nod to Sherlock Holmes while doing detective work.

Similarly, the Eleventh Doctor, played by Matt Smith, wore an ulster coat when posing as Sherlock Holmes on the Doctor Who episode The Snowmen.

See also
 Inverness cape
 Loden cape
 Duster (clothing)

References

Coats (clothing)
Formal wear